Kansas is a state located in the Midwestern United States. According to the 2021 United States Census estimate its population is 2,934,582 and Kansas has a growth rate of 0.57% annually, which ranks 31st among all 50 states. Kansas is the 13th largest by land area spanning  of land. Kansas is divided into 105 counties and contains 627 municipalities consisting of cities.

City requirements
All incorporated communities in Kansas are called cities, unlike in some states where some are called towns or villages. (11 of 50 states only have cities).

Once a city is incorporated in Kansas, it will continue to be a city even after falling below the minimum required to become a city, and even if the minimum is later raised.  A city can de-incorporate, but if citizens decide to re-incorporate at a later date, then new minimum requirements must be met.

By State law, cities in Kansas are divided into three classes.

 Cities of the 3rd Class - When a city incorporates, it becomes a city of the 3rd class. To incorporate, a city must generally have either 300 inhabitants or 300 or more platted lots served by water and sewer lines.  This minimum requirement has increased since older historical minimum requirements.
 Cities of the 2nd Class - A city may petition to become a city of the 2nd class when its population is more than 2,000 but less than 15,000. A city whose population is between 2,000 and 5,000 may elect to remain a city of the 3rd class, but must become a city of the 2nd class when it reaches 5,000 population.
 Cities of the 1st Class - A city may petition to become a city of the 1st class when its population reaches 15,000. A city whose population is between 15,000 and 25,000 may elect to remain a city of the 2nd class but must become a city of the 1st class when it reaches 25,000 population.

Highest population listing
Population data based on 2010 census and 2020 census with over 5,000 people.  The city of Topeka, in addition to being the county seat for Shawnee County, is the state capital.

Military installations

See Kansas forts and posts for a historical list
As a supplement to the list of cities, the following military installations are provided because of their relative size in active duty and/or service members living on the post and their location within the borders of the state of Kansas.  The table values for "Population in Quarters" includes reported totals of active duty, family, civilians, reservists, and retired personnel living on the installation.

As of 2016, over 85,000 people live on military installations in Kansas—including over 25,000 active duty personnel.  Although not considered "cities", these military installations certainly should be considered as population centers of note.

Alphabetical listing

A

Abbyville
Abilene
Admire
Agenda
Agra
Albert
Alden
Alexander
Allen
Alma
Almena
Alta Vista
Altamont
Alton
Altoona
Americus
Andale
Andover
Anthony
Arcadia
Argonia
Arkansas City
Arlington
Arma
Ashland
Assaria
Atchison
Athol
Atlanta
Attica
Atwood
Auburn
Augusta
Aurora
Axtell

B

Baldwin City
Barnard
Barnes
Bartlett
Basehor
Bassett
Baxter Springs
Bazine
Beattie
Bel Aire
Belle Plaine
Belleville
Beloit
Belpre
Belvue
Benedict
Bennington
Bentley
Benton
Bern
Beverly
Bird City
Bison
Blue Mound
Blue Rapids
Bluff City
Bogue
Bonner Springs
Brewster
Bronson
Brookville
Brownell
Bucklin
Buffalo
Buhler
Bunker Hill
Burden
Burdett
Burlingame
Burlington
Burns
Burr Oak
Burrton
Bushong
Bushton
Byers

C

Caldwell
Cambridge
Caney
Canton
Carbondale
Carlton
Cassoday
Cawker City
Cedar
Cedar Point
Cedar Vale
Centralia
Chanute
Chapman
Chase
Chautauqua
Cheney
Cherokee
Cherryvale
Chetopa
Cimarron
Circleville
Claflin
Clay Center
Clayton
Clearwater
Clifton
Climax
Clyde
Coats
Coffeyville
Colby
Coldwater
Collyer
Colony
Columbus
Colwich
Concordia
Conway Springs
Coolidge
Copeland
Corning
Cottonwood Falls
Council Grove
Courtland
Coyville
Cuba
Cullison
Culver
Cunningham

D

Damar
Danville
De Soto
Dearing
Deerfield
Delia
Delphos
Denison
Denton
Derby
Dexter
Dighton
Dodge City
Dorrance
Douglass
Downs
Dresden
Dunlap
Durham
Dwight

E

Earlton
Eastborough
Easton
Edgerton
Edmond
Edna
Edwardsville
Effingham
El Dorado
Elbing
Elgin
Elk City
Elk Falls
Elkhart
Ellinwood
Ellis
Ellsworth
Elmdale
Elsmore
Elwood
Emmett
Emporia
Englewood
Ensign
Enterprise
Erie
Esbon
Eskridge
Eudora
Eureka
Everest

F

Fairview
Fairway
Fall River
Florence
Fontana
Ford
Formoso
Fort Scott
Fowler
Frankfort
Frederick
Fredonia
Frontenac
Fulton

G

Galatia
Galena
Galesburg
Galva
Garden City
Garden Plain
Gardner
Garfield
Garnett
Gas
Gaylord
Gem
Geneseo
Geuda Springs
Girard
Glade
Glasco
Glen Elder
Goddard
Goessel
Goff
Goodland
Gorham
Gove City
Grainfield
Grandview Plaza
Great Bend
Greeley
Green
Greenleaf
Greensburg
Grenola
Gridley
Grinnell
Gypsum

H

Haddam
Halstead
Hamilton
Hamlin
Hanover
Hanston
Hardtner
Harper
Hartford
Harveyville
Havana
Haven
Havensville
Haviland
Hays
Haysville
Hazelton
Hepler
Herington
Herndon
Hesston
Hiawatha
Highland
Hill City
Hillsboro
Hoisington
Holcomb
Hollenberg
Holton
Holyrood
Hope
Horace
Horton
Howard
Hoxie
Hoyt
Hudson
Hugoton
Humboldt
Hunnewell
Hunter
Huron
Hutchinson

I

Independence
Ingalls
Inman
Iola
Isabel
Iuka

J

Jamestown
Jennings
Jetmore
Jewell
Johnson City
Junction City

K

Kanopolis
Kanorado
Kansas City
Kechi
Kensington
Kincaid
Kingman
Kinsley
Kiowa
Kirwin
Kismet

L

Labette
La Crosse
La Cygne
La Harpe
Lake Quivira
Lakin
Lancaster
Lane
Langdon
Lansing
Larned
Latham
Latimer
Lawrence
Leavenworth
Le Roy
Leawood
Lebanon
Lebo
Lecompton
Lehigh
Lenexa
Lenora
Leon
Leona
Leonardville
Leoti
Lewis
Liberal
Liberty
Liebenthal
Lincoln Center
Lincolnville
Lindsborg
Linn
Linn Valley
Linwood
Little River
Logan
Lone Elm
Longford
Long Island
Longton
Lorraine
Lost Springs
Louisburg
Louisville
Lucas
Luray
Lyndon
Lyons

M

Macksville
Madison
Mahaska
Maize
Manchester
Manhattan
Mankato
Manter
Maple Hill
Mapleton
Marion
Marquette
Marysville
Matfield Green
Mayetta
Mayfield
McCracken
McCune
McDonald
McFarland
McLouth
McPherson
Meade
Medicine Lodge
Melvern
Menlo
Meriden
Merriam
Milan
Milford
Miltonvale
Minneapolis
Minneola
Mission
Mission Hills
Mission Woods
Moline
Montezuma
Moran
Morganville
Morland
Morrill
Morrowville
Moscow
Mound City
Mound Valley
Moundridge
Mount Hope
Mulberry
Mullinville
Mulvane
Munden
Muscotah

N

Narka
Nashville
Natoma
Neodesha
Neosho Falls
Neosho Rapids
Ness City
Netawaka
New Albany
New Cambria
New Strawn
Newton
Nickerson
Niotaze
Norcatur
North Newton
Norton
Nortonville
Norwich

O

Oak Hill
Oakley
Oberlin
Offerle
Ogden
Oketo
Olathe
Olivet
Olmitz
Olpe
Olsburg
Onaga
Oneida
Osage City
Osawatomie
Osborne
Oskaloosa
Oswego
Otis
Ottawa
Overbrook
Overland Park
Oxford
Ozawkie

P

Palco
Palmer
Paola
Paradise
Park
Park City
Parker
Parkerfield
Parkerville
Parsons
Partridge
Pawnee Rock
Paxico
Peabody
Penalosa
Perry
Peru
Phillipsburg
Pittsburg
Plains
Plainville
Pleasanton
Plevna
Pomona
Portis
Potwin
Powhattan
Prairie View
Prairie Village
Pratt
Prescott
Preston
Pretty Prairie
Princeton
Protection

Q
Quenemo
Quinter

R

Radium
Ramona
Randall
Randolph
Ransom
Rantoul
Raymond
Reading
Redfield
Republic
Reserve
Rexford
Richfield
Richmond
Riley
Robinson
Roeland Park
Rolla
Rose Hill
Roseland
Rossville
Rozel
Rush Center
Russell
Russell Springs

S

Sabetha
St. Francis
St. George
St. John
St. Marys
St. Paul
Salina
Satanta
Savonburg
Sawyer
Scammon
Scandia
Schoenchen
Scott City
Scottsville
Scranton
Sedan
Sedgwick
Selden
Seneca
Severance
Severy
Seward
Sharon
Sharon Springs
Shawnee
Silver Lake
Simpson
Smith Center
Smolan
Soldier
Solomon
South Haven
South Hutchinson
Spearville
Speed
Spivey
Spring Hill
Stafford
Stark
Sterling
Stockton
Strong City
Sublette
Summerfield
Sun City
Susank
Sylvan Grove
Sylvia
Syracuse

T

Tampa
Tescott
Thayer
The Highlands
Timken
Tipton
Tonganoxie
Topeka
Toronto
Towanda
Tribune
Troy
Turon
Tyro

U

Udall
Ulysses
Uniontown
Utica

V

Valley Center
Valley Falls
Vermillion
Victoria
Vining
Viola
Virgil

W

WaKeeney
Wakefield
Waldo
Waldron
Wallace
Walnut
Walton
Wamego
Washington
Waterville
Wathena
Waverly
Webber
Weir
Wellington
Wellsville
West Mineral
Westmoreland
Westphalia
Westwood
Westwood Hills
Wetmore
Wheaton
White City
White Cloud
Whitewater
Whiting
Wichita
Willard
Williamsburg
Willis
Willowbrook
Wilmore
Wilsey
Wilson
Winchester
Windom
Winfield
Winona
Woodbine
Woodston

X
none

Y
Yates Center

Z
Zenda
Zurich

Fictional cities
 Flowers, Kansas, from the book The Van Gogh Cafe, located on I-70 interstate.
 Jericho, Kansas, setting of the 2006 TV series Jericho, located approximately where the real cities of Colby and Oakley are located in northwest Kansas.
 Rustwater, Kansas, the setting of the 1992 film Leap of Faith.
 Smallville, Kansas, childhood hometown of fictional character Superman.
 Stubbville, Kansas, the town the "people train" passes through near Wichita in the film Planes, Trains, and Automobiles.
 Nowhere, Kansas, the nearest town to the main farmhouse in the 1999 animated series Courage the Cowardly Dog.
 Rachel, Kansas, the setting of the 1966 film, The Ghost and Mr. Chicken.
 Pork Corners, Kansas, hometown of Sgt. Orville Snorkel of Beetle Bailey comics.

See also
 List of counties in Kansas
 List of townships in Kansas
 List of unincorporated communities in Kansas
 List of census-designated places in Kansas
 List of ghost towns in Kansas
 Lists of places in Kansas
 Kansas locations by per capita income
 Kansas census statistical areas
 Kansas license plate county codes

References

External links

Additional information
Kansas Department of Transportation (KDOT): Intrastate mileage between cities
Historical Directory of Kansas Towns

Photos, maps and other images
City maps from KDOT

Kansas geography-related lists
Kansas